Miners Union Hall, located east of Philipsburg, Montana in Deerlodge National Forest, is a historic building built in 1890.  Also known as Granite Miners Union Hall, it served as a meeting hall.  It was listed on the National Register of Historic Places in 1974.

In its first floor was a pool parlor and a club area;  on the second floor was a large dance floor, an auditorium space, and an office and library.

References 

Clubhouses on the National Register of Historic Places in Montana
Buildings and structures completed in 1890
National Register of Historic Places in Granite County, Montana
1890 establishments in Montana
Beaverhead-Deerlodge National Forest
Miners' labor movement
Mining in Montana
Trade unions in Montana
Labor history of the United States